Alessandro Molinari (1898 – 1962) was the first General Director of ISTAT, which was then known as the National Institute of Technology, in Fascist Italy. Born in Veneto, he became the General Manager of SVIMEZ from 1948 to 1958.

References

External links 
 ISTAT website
 CORRADO GINI AND ITALIAN STATISTICS UNDER FASCISM
  
  
 La Lezione Sassarese di Paolo Sylos Labini (1956-1958) 
SVIMEZ

1898 births
1962 deaths
Scientists from Veneto
20th-century Italian people
Italian statisticians